Rick Jason (born Richard Jacobson; May 21, 1923 – October 16, 2000) was an American actor, born in New York City, and most remembered for starring in the ABC television drama Combat! (1962–1967).

Childhood
An only child of Jewish parents, Jason was expelled from several prep schools before graduating from Rhodes Preparatory School in Manhattan.

Military service
Rick Jason served from 1943 to 1945 in the U.S. Army Air Corps, during World War II.  In the late 1960s and early 1970s, he visited American troops serving in Vietnam on several USO tours.

Acting career

Later, MGM was searching for an actor to replace Fernando Lamas in the 1953 movie Sombrero and gave the role to Jason, who was earlier released from Columbia Pictures. This led to Jason being cast in The Saracen Blade (1954) and This Is My Love (1954).

In 1956, Jason played the lead in The Fountain of Youth, a half-hour unsold pilot written and directed by Orson Welles which won the Peabody Award in 1958.

Soon after, Jason received offers for television series. He guest-starred on ABC's anthology series, The Pepsi-Cola Playhouse. In 1954, he played Joaquin Murietta, the notorious Mexican bandit of the California Gold Rush, in an episode of Jim Davis's syndicated western series Stories of the Century,  the story of a railroad detective investigating crime in the American West. He appeared on the NBC interview program Here's Hollywood, in the Rawhide episodes "Incident of the Coyote Weed" and "Incident of the Valley in Shadow", and co-starred in 1969 in The Monk.

In 1960, he starred as insurance investigator Robin Scott in The Case of the Dangerous Robin, a syndicated American television series that lasted only one season.  It was not renewed due to Jason's health issues, including back problems.  In 1962, he began starring in the television series Combat! as Platoon Leader 2nd Lt. Gil Hanley, probably his most memorable role. In this series he shared the starring role in an alternating episode rotation, with Vic Morrow as Sgt. Chip Saunders, though in many episodes they both appeared.  The show was a hit that lasted for 152 episodes in five seasons.
	 
After Combat!, Rick returned to stage acting. He made films in Japan and Israel, as well as films such as Color Me Dead (1969), The Day of the Wolves (1971), The Witch Who Came from the Sea (1976), Love and the Midnight Auto Supply (1977), Partners (1982) and Illegally Yours (1988). He also played Cornelius Vanderbilt in the 1989 miniseries Around the World in 80 Days. In 1973, he was a frequent character on The Young and the Restless. He was also a favorite voice for TV commercial narration in the 1960s.

Retirement
After retiring from screen appearances, Jason kept busy by doing voice-overs for commercials and wrote his autobiography, Scrapbooks of My Mind. In 2000, he attended a Combat! reunion in Las Vegas with fellow cast members.

Personal life
In his personal life, Jason enjoyed playing guitar, painting, sculpting, collecting wines, flying, hunting, photography, and breeding tropical fish.

In 2000, Jason published his autobiography Scrapbooks of My Mind: A Hollywood Autobiography. The book describes Jason growing up in New York during the Great Depression and shares behind-the-scenes stories of his film and tv career. The book was pulled from publication after his death in October 2000. An online version of the book exists on the web.

Death
Jason died from a self-inflicted gunshot wound one week after the Combat! reunion, on October 16, 2000, in Moorpark, California, where he lived. He left no note. Authorities said the actor was "despondent" over "unspecified personal matters."

His body was cremated and interred at the Hollywood Forever Cemetery in Hollywood, Los Angeles, California in the Cathedral Mausoleum.

Legacy
Concerning Combat!, pop culture scholar Gene Santoro has written:

Producer Steve Rubin wrote a tribute to Jason published in the Los Angeles Times on October 20, 2000:

Rubin concluded:

Filmography

Notes

References
Jason, Rick. Scrapbooks of My Mind : A Hollywood Autobiography; Strange New Worlds; 1st edition 29 July 2000; 

Obituary in Variety; 9 November 2000

External links

 
 The Fountain of Youth on YouTube
 The Life and Sad Ending of Rick Jason (December 18, 2020) Access Date: March 9, 2022
 A Salute to Rick Jason (as platoon leader 2nd Lt. Gil Hanley) 2018 Access Date: March 9, 2022

1923 births
2000 deaths
Jewish American male actors
American male film actors
American male stage actors
American male television actors
American male voice actors
Male actors from New York City
Suicides by firearm in California
Burials at Hollywood Forever Cemetery
United States Army Air Forces personnel of World War II
20th-century American male actors
People from Moorpark, California
2000 suicides
United States Army Air Forces soldiers
20th-century American Jews